Ion Marin Sadoveanu (born Iancu-Leonte Marinescu; June 15, 1893 – February 2, 1964) was a Romanian playwright.

Biography 
Born in Bucharest, he started his education at a grammar school in Constanța, where his father practiced medicine. He continued at the Mircea cel Bătrân Gymnasium, from which he graduated in 1908. He continued his education at the Saint Sava National College of Bucharest (1908–1912). He then studied philosophy in Bucharest and Paris. In 1926, he was appointed inspector of the theaters, being subsequently promoted to inspector general and in 1933 director general of the theaters and operas. Demoted in 1940, he worked as editor at the Timpul newspaper (1941–1942) and playwright of the National Theatre Bucharest until 1944. He then was editor of Universul. In 1956, he was appointed director of the National Theatre Bucharest. From 1958, he was also a member of the National Commission for UNESCO. He died in Bucharest in 1964, age 70, and was buried in the city's Bellu Cemetery.

References

Dicționarul Enciclopedic Român, ed. Politică, București, 1962–1966
Dicționar de literatură română contemporană, ed. Albatros, București, 1977

1893 births
1964 deaths
Writers from Bucharest
Mircea cel Bătrân National College (Constanța) alumni
Romanian newspaper editors
Romanian male novelists
Male dramatists and playwrights
20th-century Romanian novelists
20th-century Romanian dramatists and playwrights
20th-century Romanian male writers
Burials at Bellu Cemetery
Chairpersons of the National Theatre Bucharest